Benjamin Matlack Everhart (born 24 April 1818; died 22 September 1904) was a United States mycologist.

Biography
His father, William Everhart, the son of a Revolutionary soldier, was a merchant, and a member of congress in 1853-55. Benjamin was educated in private schools in West Chester, and spent his early life in mercantile business there and in Charleston, South Carolina, making a comfortable fortune.

From boyhood, he was an ardent student of botany, and after retiring from business in 1867 he devoted himself almost entirely to that science, particularly to cryptogamic botany. In connection with J. B. Ellis, of New Jersey, he was active in issuing yearly fifty volumes, called The Century of North American Fungi, each volume describing 100 species. At the same time, with William A. Kellerman, of Kansas, they published the Journal of Mycology.

He discovered many new fungi. The genus Everhartia was named by Pier Andrea Saccardo in Everhart's honour (in 1888), as well as the following species:

 Everhartia hymenuloides Sacc. et Ellis
 Melanconis Everhartii Ellis
 Myrioccoccum Everhartii Ellis & Sacc.
 Ophionectria Everhartii Ellis & Gal.
 Mucronoporus Everhartii Ellis & Gal.
 Pestalozzia Everhartii Sacc. & Syd.
 Sorosporium Everhartii Ellis & Gal.
 Dothiorella Everhartii Sacc. & Syd.
 Gloeosporium Everhartii Sacc. & Syd.
 Myxosporium Everhartii Sacc. & Syd.
 Phyllosticta Everhartii Sacc. & Syd.
 Physalospora Everhartii Sacc. & Syd.
 Septoria Everhartii Sacc. & Syd.

Family
His brother James Bowen Everhart was a member of congress.

Notes

References
 

Attribution

1818 births
1904 deaths
American mycologists
People from West Chester, Pennsylvania
19th-century American businesspeople